The 2020–21 Wessex Football League season (known as the Sydenhams Football League (Wessex) for sponsorship reasons) was the 35th in the history of the Wessex Football League since its establishment in 1986. The league consisted of two divisions: the Premier Division and Division One.

The constitution was announced on 21 July 2020.

After the abandonment of the previous season due to the COVID-19 pandemic, the league's constitution largely remained unchanged, with the planned structural changes being put back to this season.

This season, the Premier Division champions were to be promoted to Step 4. The runners-up in this division and ten other Step 5 divisions in other leagues were to be ranked according to PPG (points per game), and the top four in that ranking would have also been promoted. The remaining seven runners-up would compete in "winner takes all" play-offs with seven clubs finishing bottom in Step 4 leagues, the winners being placed at Step 4 and the losers at Step 5 for 2021–22.

The bottom clubs in all 14 Step 5 divisions were to be ranked according to PPG, with the 12 lowest-ranked clubs relegated to Step 6.

In Division One, the top four clubs were to be promoted to Step 5, and the bottom two were liable to relegation to Step 7.

Curtailment
On 24 February 2021, after fixtures had been suspended in December 2020, the FA curtailed the season for all leagues at Steps 3–6, again due to the COVID-19 pandemic.

Premier Division
The Premier Division remained at 20 clubs, with the same constitution as the previous season except for the absence of Solent University, who resigned from the league in June 2020.

One new team joined the division:
Blackfield & Langley, resigned from the Southern League Premier Division South.

League table at time of curtailment

Division One
Division One was reduced from 20 clubs to 19 after Pewsey Vale resigned during the previous season.

League table at time of curtailment

References

External links
 Wessex Football League official site

Wessex Football League seasons
9
Wessex Football League, 2020-21